Stenopadus is a genus of South American plants in the family Asteraceae.

 Species

 formerly included
see Chimantaea Stomatochaeta

References

Wunderlichioideae
Asteraceae genera
Flora of South America
Taxonomy articles created by Polbot